Elliott Miles Goodman (August 27, 1948 – August 16, 1996) was an American composer for television and film. He is best remembered for his frequent collaboration with film director Frank Oz, for whom Goodman scored such films as Dirty Rotten Scoundrels (1988), What About Bob? (1991) and Housesitter (1992). For his score to Oz's Little Shop of Horrors (1986), Goodman was nominated for the Golden Globe Award for Best Original Score.

Early life and education
Goodman was born on August 27, 1948 in Los Angeles.  He graduated from Antioch College in Yellow Springs, Ohio, in 1972 with a degree in English.  In 1969, he studied Shakespeare in London.

Goodman became interested in film scoring through his cousin, Johnny Mandel, an Oscar-winning film composer.  Goodman at first planned to become a director, despite his strong and eclectic taste in jazz and other music.  But composing for film intervened in conversations with Mandel.  As a result, Goodman returned to Los Angeles and studied music and film scoring with private teachers including Albert Harris.

"He was very eclectic in his musical tastes. Before film scoring he was very attracted to jazz, Brazilian music and theater. He started life as a songwriter," Mandel said.  Mandel would serve as a mentor for Goodman.

Career
When Goodman relocated to Hollywood, he met Oscar Castro-Neves, who became his friend and music partner.  They worked together for 30 years.  "He started from ground zero, (learning) 'This is a middle C,' and became . . . a great musician," said Castro-Neves. "He was a very inspired composer with a great ability to write melodies and a great orchestral talent."

By the mid-1970s, Goodman did his first film projects as composer for such films as Slumber Party '57 (1976).

In 1979, Goodman arranged orchestrations on the Peter Sellers comedy Being There for Mandel.  Goodman and Mandel would continue to collaborate with each other over the next few years, most notably to score Sidney Lumet's Oscar-nominated film, The Verdict (1982).  He later composed the score for Teen Wolf (1985), starring Michael J. Fox.

He also orchestrated or scored music for Footloose (1984), About Last Night (1986), Little Shop of Horrors (1986), La Bamba (1987), Dirty Rotten Scoundrels (1988), Problem Child (1990), What About Bob? (1991), Housesitter (1992), Sister Act 2: Back in the Habit (1993), Dunston Checks In (1996), Larger Than Life (1996) and 'Til There Was You (1997), the latter two released posthumously.  Working so often in films under the genre of comedy manifested Goodman's reputation as the "King of Comedy."  Variety praised Goodman's score for Dirty Rotten Scoundrels, calling it "a great, imitative '30s jazzy score."  Goodman also composed music for the 1989 Australian film, The Delinquents.

When a friend suggested to Goodman that he try producing records, he conceived an album of contemporary Brazilian music with harmonica great Toots Thielemans titled The Brasil Project.

Goodman and Castro-Neves were also co-producers of a series of well-reviewed jazz albums. They arranged 12 selections for the successful The Billie Holiday Songbook and for Color and Light: Jazz Sketches on Sondheim, which featured jazz artists interpreting the works of Stephen Sondheim.  Color and Light: Jazz Sketches of Sondheim was produced by Goodman and Castro-Neves in 1995 and was highly praised.  The album was named one of the year's top five albums by Time and reached No. 6 on Billboard's jazz charts. The Billie Holiday Songbook, featuring trumpeter Terence Blanchard, was also a hit with critics and customers.

"Working with Miles Goodman was also a great experience with me," Blanchard said.  Blanchard considered Goodman his mentor. According to Blanchard, they met when Goodman hired him to play on the soundtrack for his score to Housesitter.  They remained friends until Goodman's death.

Goodman and Blanchard have collaborated with Brazilian vocalist and pianist Ivan Lins.  Goodman had also produced the album, A Brazilian Christmas, as well as having produced discs by Vanessa Rubin.  Goodman and Castro-Neves had also worked on a project of an audio-only series of classic children's stories narrated over newly composed music with other artists.

He even completed work on several albums that were scheduled for release by 1997 that featured such artists as cellist Yo-Yo Ma, soprano Kathleen Battle and pianist Ottmar Liebert.

According to Frank Oz, Goodman completed and recorded a full score for the film, The Indian in the Cupboard (1995), but it was rejected and replaced by Randy Edelman's score as a result.  Oz also claimed to have asked Goodman just before his death to do the music for his subsequent film In & Out (1997).

In January 1996, Goodman and Blanchard were hired to score the romantic comedy, 'Til There Was You (1997), released by Paramount Pictures.  Director Scott Winant approved the duo, thinking the comical mastery of Goodman and the jazzy romance of Blanchard would make the perfect combination.  Blanchard was even excited about collaborating with his friend and mentor that he rearranged his summer tour of The Heart Speaks around Goodman's ever-busy scoring schedule.

On November 18, 1996, Goodman was posthumously awarded the SOCAN Film Music Award by the Society of Composers, Authors and Music Publishers of Canada.

Personal life and death
Goodman died from a heart attack at St. John's Hospital and Medical Center in Santa Monica, California on August 16, 1996.

"There was some heart disease in the family. His father passed away from a heart attack, but he was really healthy and it was entirely unexpected," Dylan Goodman said.  He was described as "a wonderful talent" by his cousin, Johnny Mandel.  He was also close friends with Frank Oz, who referred to Goodman as "Bud."

"I had nothing but respect for his work," said fellow jazz producer Steve Backer, "He realized that jazz needed a smart contextualization to sell in big numbers, and he and his partner Oscar Castro-Neves had great ideas that revitalized several artists."

Since his death, Antioch College, Goodman's alma mater, has implemented a scholarship fund in his name.

List of work

Filmography

Television credits

Other credits
1983 Gospel (Documentary)
1987 Oh Happy Day (Video)

References

External links

 
Miles Goodman on his score for The Delinquents on YouTube

1948 births
1996 deaths
20th-century American composers
20th-century classical musicians
American film score composers
Antioch College alumni
American male film score composers
Musicians from Los Angeles
People from Brentwood, California
Record producers from California
20th-century American male musicians
La-La Land Records artists